Trevor Gregory Fehrman (born July 14, 1981) is an American actor and writer best known for his portrayal of Elias in the 2006 comedy film, Clerks II.

Life and career
Trevor is most widely known for his role in the film Clerks II in which he plays Elias Grover, Dante and Randal's new co-worker at the Mooby's fast food chain. Fehrman also appeared in Now You Know, which was written, directed and also featured Clerks II co-star Jeff Anderson. Kevin Smith brought Fehrman back to reprise his role in Clerks III. He also played Handsome Davis, a teen student who cheats his way through high school in Cheats.

In 2013, Fehrman contributed film reviews for the website Film Racket.

Filmography

Film

Television

References

External links

American male film actors
Living people
1981 births
People from South St. Paul, Minnesota